The Walpole Society, named after Horace Walpole, was founded in 1911 to promote the study of the history of British art and artists.

From 1762 on, Walpole had published the first history of art in Britain, based on the manuscript notebooks of George Vertue, the most important source of information concerning British art before the mid-eighteenth century. One of the first goals of the Society was to publish these notebooks in their original form, which included much material that Walpole omitted.

The Society, based in London, publishes an annual volume of studies written by its members and scholars around the world. The field of research includes paintings, drawings, prints, miniatures, sculpture and illuminated manuscripts as well as patronage, collecting and travel. The period covered is the whole of the history of British art, from the Middle Ages to the present.

See also
 English school of painting; art history

References

External links
the Walpole Society online

Learned societies of the United Kingdom
1911 establishments in the United Kingdom
Organizations established in 1911